The Jerico River is a  river on the Atlantic coastal plain in the U.S. state of Georgia.  It serves as the boundary between Bryan and Liberty counties for its entire length.

See also
List of rivers of Georgia

References 

USGS Hydrologic Unit Map - State of Georgia (1974)

Rivers of Georgia (U.S. state)
Rivers of Bryan County, Georgia
Rivers of Liberty County, Georgia